The 1987 Supertaça Cândido de Oliveira was the 9th edition of the Supertaça Cândido de Oliveira, the annual Portuguese football season-opening match contested by the winners of the previous season's top league and cup competitions (or cup runner-up in case the league- and cup-winning club is the same). The 1987 Supertaça Cândido de Oliveira was contested over two legs, and opposed Benfica and Sporting CP of the Primeira Liga. Benfica qualified for the SuperCup by winning the 1986–87 Primeira Divisão and the 1986–87 Taça de Portugal, whilst Sporting CP qualified for the Supertaça by being the cup-runner.

The first leg which took place at the Estádio da Luz, saw Sporting CP defeat Benfica 3–0. The second leg which took place at the Estádio José Alvalade saw a 1–0 Sporting CP win (4–0 on aggregate), which granted the Leões a second Supertaça.

First leg

Details

Second leg

Details

References

Supertaça Cândido de Oliveira
1987–88 in Portuguese football
S.L. Benfica matches
Sporting CP matches